Polish Socialist Party of Lithuania and Belarus was a left-wing political party, that was an autonomous branch of Polish Socialist Party, and which operated in Lithuania and Belarus in the late 1910s and early 1920s. Its political programme was identical with the one of Polish Socialist Party, and was based around left-wing nationalism and revolutionary socialism.

History 
In the late 1910s, it operated in the area of Lithuania and Belarus, as an autonomous branch of Polish Socialist Party, which operated in Poland. Its political programme was identical with the one of Polish Socialist Party, and was based around left-wing nationalism and revolutionary socialism. In 1918, Aleksander Zasztowt became its leader and remained as such until 1923. Since 1920, it was active in the Republic of Central Lithuania, and following the 1922 general elections, it held 3 seats in the Sejm of Central Lithuania. It as present in the Sejm until March 1922, when it was disbanded, and Central Lithuania incorporated into Poland shortly after that.

Citations

Notes

References 

Defunct political parties in Lithuania
Defunct political parties in Belarus
Defunct political parties in Russia
Defunct socialist parties in Russia
Defunct nationalist parties in Russia
Political parties in the Republic of Central Lithuania
Defunct socialist parties in Poland
Centre-left parties in Europe
Defunct agrarian political parties
Defunct socialist parties in Europe
Polish Socialist Party